The Canton of Perpignan-4 is a French canton of Pyrénées-Orientales department, in Occitanie. It covers the central and southern part of the commune of Perpignan. At the French canton reorganisation which came into effect in March 2015, the canton was enlarged.

Composition
Before 2015, the canton included the following neighbourhoods of Perpignan:
 La Lunette
 Moulin à Vent
 University
 Porte d'Espagne
 Mas Palégry

References 

Perpignan 4